John Robert Widdowson (born 12 September 1941) is an English former professional footballer who played as a goalkeeper in the Football League for Sheffield United, York City and Portsmouth and in non-League football for British Ropes and Gainsborough Trinity.

References

1941 births
Living people
Sportspeople from Loughborough
Footballers from Leicestershire
English footballers
Association football goalkeepers
British Ropes F.C. players
Sheffield United F.C. players
York City F.C. players
Portsmouth F.C. players
Gainsborough Trinity F.C. players
English Football League players